This is a list of members of the House of Commons of Canada in the 40th Canadian Parliament (November 18, 2008 to March 26, 2011).

Members
Party leaders are italicized.
Cabinet ministers are in boldface.
The Prime Minister is both.

Alberta

British Columbia

Manitoba

New Brunswick

Newfoundland and Labrador

Nova Scotia

Ontario

Prince Edward Island

Quebec

Saskatchewan

The North

Changes since the 40th election
The party standings have changed as follows:

Membership changes

See also
List of senators in the 40th Parliament of Canada
Women in the 40th Canadian Parliament

References

House Members Of The 40th Parliament Of Canada, List Of
40th